Kamianka was a rural settlement in Pokrovsk Raion (district) in Donetsk Oblast of eastern Ukraine, at  north-northwest from the centre of Donetsk city.

The War in Donbas, which started in mid-April 2014, has brought along both civilian and military casualties.

2022 Invasion of Ukraine
The town became a site of renewed fighting during the 2022 Russian invasion of Ukraine due to its proximity to Avdiivka.

Demographics
Native language as of the Ukrainian Census of 2001:
Ukrainian — 36.4%
Russian — 63.6%

References

External links
 Weather forecast for Kamianka

Villages in Pokrovsk Raion